Ixora johnsonii is a species of flowering plant in the family Rubiaceae. It is endemic to Ernakulam in the state of Kerala, India.

References

External links
World Checklist of Rubiaceae

johnsonii
Flora of Kerala
Critically endangered plants
Taxonomy articles created by Polbot